The Pont d'Oxford is a cable-stayed bridge over the Isère river in Grenoble, France. It was completed in 1991.

The bridge is named after the city of Oxford, with which Grenoble is twinned.

References

Bridges completed in 1991
Buildings and structures in Grenoble
Cable-stayed bridges in France
Transport in Auvergne-Rhône-Alpes
1991 establishments in France